Ári Mohr Jónsson (born 22 July 1994) is a Faroese international footballer who plays for HB Tórshavn, as a left-back. He has also played for the Danish club Silkeborg and the Norwegian club Sandnes Ulf.

Club career
Jónsson has played club football for Silkeborg and HB Tórshavn.

In January 2018, Jónsson signed for Norwegian club Sandnes Ulf in OBOS-ligaen.

International career

He made his international debut for Faroe Islands in 2013.

In 17 November 2020, Jónsson scores his first international goal against Malta in the 2020–21 UEFA Nations League D match during a 1–1 draw.

International goals
Scores and results list Faroe Islands' goal tally first.

References

 Silkeborg ophæver med venstreback‚ bold.dk, 17 February 2016

1994 births
Living people
Faroese footballers
Faroe Islands international footballers
Faroese expatriate footballers
Expatriate men's footballers in Denmark
Expatriate footballers in Norway
Faroese expatriate sportspeople in Norway
Silkeborg IF players
Sandnes Ulf players
Danish Superliga players
Norwegian First Division players
Association football defenders
Faroe Islands youth international footballers
Havnar Bóltfelag players